Kozhikode North State assembly constituency is one of the 140 state legislative assembly constituencies in Kerala state in southern India.  It is also one of the 7 state legislative assembly constituencies included in the Kozhikode Lok Sabha constituency.
 As of the 2021 assembly elections, the current MLA is Thottathil Ravindran of CPI(M).

Kozhikode North constituency came into existence in 2011. Before it was known as Calicut-I from 1957 to 2011.

Local self governed segments
Kozhikode North Niyama Sabha constituency is composed of the following wards of the Kozhikode Municipal Corporation:

Members of Legislative Assembly
The following list contains all members of Kerala legislative assembly who have represented Kozhikode North Niyamasabha Constituency during the period of various assemblies:

Key

 

As Calicut-I

As Kozhikode North

Election results
Percentage change (±%) denotes the change in the number of votes from the immediate previous election.

Niyamasabha Election 2021 
There were 1,80,909 registered voters in Kozhikode North  Constituency for the 2021 Kerala Niyamasabha Election.

Niyamasabha Election 2016
There were 1,69,752 registered voters in Kozhikode North  Constituency for the 2016 Kerala Niyamasabha Election.

Niyamasabha Election 2011 
There were 1,50,4325 registered voters in the constituency for the 2011 election.

See also 
 Kozhikode North
 Kozhikode district
 List of constituencies of the Kerala Legislative Assembly
 2016 Kerala Legislative Assembly election

References 

Assembly constituencies of Kerala

State assembly constituencies in Kozhikode district